Al-Sudani (in Arabic السوداني, meaning The Sudani) is an Arabic daily newspaper in Sudan.

History and profile
Al Sudani was established in 1980 and the Carnegie Endowment gives its 2004 circulation as 305,000 copies.  

Its headquarters is in Khartum. 

Al Sudani is described as a paper which claims to be independent, but is known to be supported by the regime of the country. However, the paper has been suspended by the Sudanese authorities in different periods and its editor-in-chief and another journalist writing for the paper were arrested in 2006.

References

See also 
 List of newspapers in Sudan

Publications established in 1980
Newspapers published in Sudan
Arabic newspapers
1980 establishments in Sudan
Mass media in Khartoum